"If I Let You Go" is a song by Irish boy band Westlife. It was released in the United Kingdom on 9 August 1999 as the second single from their self-titled debut album (1999). It became the second number-one hit, spending 11 weeks on the UK Singles Chart. The song has received a gold sales certification in the UK for selling over 400,000 in combined sales of purchased and streaming-equivalent sales. It is the band's 10th-best-selling single in paid-for sales and combined sales in the UK as of January 2019.

Composition
"If I Let You Go" composed in the traditional verse–chorus form in B major, with Brian McFadden, Shane Filan, and Mark Feehily's vocals ranging from the chords of D4 to A5.

Music video
The music video was directed by Sven Harding and was filmed in Tenerife, Spain. It depicts the band walking along a beach and singing by a hillside surrounded by red and yellow flags.

Track listings

UK CD1
 "If I Let You Go" (radio edit)
 "Try Again"
 Enhanced CD

UK CD2
 "If I Let You Go" (radio edit)
 "If I Let You Go" (extended version)
 Interview with Andi Peters

UK cassette single and European CD single
 "If I Let You Go" (radio edit)
 "Try Again"

Australian CD single
 "If I Let You Go" (radio edit) – 3:38
 "Try Again" – 3:34
 "If I Let You Go" (extended version) – 6:07
 Enhanced CD

Credits and personnel
Credits are lifted from the UK CD1 and Westlife liner notes.

Studios
 Recorded at Cheiron Studios (Stockholm, Sweden)
 Strings recorded at Soundtrade Studios (Stockholm, Sweden)
 Mixed at Mono Music Studios (Stockholm, Sweden)

Personnel

 Jörgen Elofsson – writing
 Per Magnusson – writing, keyboards, production, arrangement, programming
 David Kreuger – writing, arrangement, programming
 Andreas Carlsson – additional backing vocals
 Mats Berntoft – acoustic and electric guitars
 Tomas Lindberg – bass
 Ulf & Henrik Janson – string arrangement
 David Kreuger – production
 Bernard Lohr – recording (strings), mixing

Charts

Weekly charts

Year-end charts

Certifications and sales

Release history

References

External links
 "If I Let You Go" Official Music video
 Official Westlife Website

1999 singles
1999 songs
Bertelsmann Music Group singles
Irish Singles Chart number-one singles
Number-one singles in Norway
RCA Records singles
Songs about loneliness
Songs written by David Kreuger
Songs written by Jörgen Elofsson
Songs written by Per Magnusson
UK Singles Chart number-one singles
Westlife songs